

Background
The South-West Indian Ocean tropical cyclone basin is located to the south of the Equator between Africa and 90°E. The basin is officially monitored by Météo-France who run the Regional Specialised  Meteorological Centre in La Réunion, while other meteorological services such as the Australian Bureau of Meteorology, Mauritius Meteorological Service as well as the United States Joint Typhoon Warning Center also monitor the basin.

Systems

|-
| Alice ||  ||  ||  || Madagascar ||  ||  ||
|-
| Christiane ||  ||  ||  || None ||  ||  ||
|-
| Esmeralda ||  ||  ||  || None ||  ||  ||
|-
| Audrey ||  ||  ||  || None ||  ||  ||
|-
| Elsa ||  ||  ||  || None ||  ||  ||
|-
| Frederique ||  ||  ||  || None ||  ||  ||
|-
| Gladys ||  ||  ||  || None ||  ||  ||
|-
| Bert–Heliotrope ||  ||  ||  || None ||  ||  ||
|-
| Carol	||  ||  ||  || None ||  ||  ||
|-
| Agathe ||  ||  ||  || || || ||
|-
| Arilisy ||  ||  ||  || Agalega, Madagascar ||  ||  ||
|-
| Iarisena ||  ||  ||  || None ||  ||  ||
|-
| Adelinina ||  ||  ||  || None ||  ||  ||
|-
| Gritelle ||  ||  ||  || None ||  ||  ||
|-
| Avoina ||  ||  ||  || None ||  ||  || 
|-
| Babie ||  ||  ||  || None ||  ||  ||
|-
| Jenna ||  ||  ||  || None ||  ||  ||
|-
| One ||  ||  ||  || Seychelles ||  ||  ||
|-
| Abaimba ||  ||  ||  || None ||  ||  ||
|-
| Phoebe ||  ||  ||  || None ||  ||  ||
|-
| 01U/01S ||  ||  ||  || None ||  ||  ||
|-
| Asma ||  ||  ||  || Madagascar ||  ||  ||

|}

2010's

|-
| Bongani ||  ||  ||  || Madagascar ||  ||  ||
|-
| David ||  ||  ||  || Reunion, Mauritius, Madagascar ||  ||  ||
|-
| Fami ||  ||  ||  || Madagascar ||  ||  ||
|-
| Cherono ||  ||  ||  || Rodrigues Island ||  ||  ||
|-
| Alenga ||  ||  ||  || None ||  ||  ||
|-
| Chanda ||  ||  ||  || Madagascar ||  ||  ||
|-
| Hilwa ||  ||  ||  || Rodrigues ||  ||  ||
|-
| Kuena ||  ||  ||  || None ||  ||  ||
|-
| Emang ||  ||  ||  || None ||  ||  ||
|-
| Jamala ||  ||  ||  || None ||  ||  ||
|-
| One/01S ||  ||  ||  || Chagos Archipelago ||  ||  ||
|-
| Deliwe ||  ||  ||  || Madagascar, Mozambique ||  ||  ||
|-
| Ivanoe ||  ||  ||  || None ||  ||  ||
|-
| Diamondra ||  ||  ||  || None ||  ||  ||
|-
| Haliba ||  ||  ||  || Madagascar, Réunion, Mauritius ||  ||  ||
|-
| Bohale ||  ||  ||  || None ||  ||  ||
|-
| Daya ||  ||  ||  || Madagascar, Réunion, Mauritius ||  ||  ||
|-
| Seven/15S ||  ||  ||  || None ||  ||  ||
|-
| Fernando ||  ||  ||  || Rodrigues ||  ||  ||
|-
| One ||  ||  ||  || None ||  ||  ||
|-
| Desmond ||  ||  ||  || Mozambique, Madagascar ||  ||  ||
|-
| Eketsang ||  ||  ||  || Madagascar ||  ||  ||
|-
| Esami ||  ||  ||  || Rodrigues ||  ||  ||
|-
| Francisco ||  ||  ||  || Madagascar ||  ||  ||
|-
| Jeruto ||  ||  ||  || None ||  ||  ||
|-
| Joshua ||  ||  ||  || None ||  ||  ||
|-
| Iman ||  ||  ||  || Mozambique, Madagascar, Réunion, Mauritius ||  ||  ||
|-
| Ana ||  ||  ||  || Mascarene Islands, Madagascar, Southern Africa ||  ||  ||
|-
| Cliff ||  ||  ||  || None ||  ||  ||
|-
| Dumako ||  ||  ||  || Madagascar, Mozambique ||  ||  ||
|-
| Fezile ||  ||  ||  || None ||  ||  ||
|-
| Karim ||  ||  ||  || None ||  ||  ||
|-
| Ashley ||  ||  ||  || None ||  ||  ||
|-
| Balita ||  ||  ||  || None ||  ||  ||
|}

Notes

See also

South-West Indian Ocean tropical cyclone

References

External links
Meteo France La Reunion

Lists of tropical cyclones by intensity
Moderate tropical storms